The Feast in the House of Simon the Pharisee is a c.1565 oil-on-canvas painting by Veronese, now in the Galleria Sabauda in Turin. 

The work was commissioned by the monks of Santi Nazaro e Celso in Verona for their refectory It was one of a series of monumental "Feasts" for monastery refectories of monasteries in Venice -  The Wedding at Cana for San Giorgio Maggiore (now in the Louvre) and another The Feast in the House of Simon the Pharisee (now in Milan) were other works in the series

References

Paintings by Paolo Veronese
Paintings in the Galleria Sabauda
1565 paintings
Paintings depicting Jesus
Paintings depicting Mary Magdalene
Dogs in art